Bruce Stewart (born 10 September 1949) is a New Zealand cricketer. He played in two first-class and two List A matches for Central Districts in 1972/73.

See also
 List of Central Districts representative cricketers

References

External links
 

1949 births
Living people
New Zealand cricketers
Central Districts cricketers
Cricketers from Masterton